Priam at the Feet of Achilles (1809) or French Priam aux pieds d'Achille is an oil-on-canvas painting by Jérôme-Martin Langlois. The painting won first prize at the Grand Prix de Rome.

History
Jérôme-Martin Langlois completed the painting titled Priam aux pieds d'Achille in 1809. It is housed at the Beaux-Arts de Paris.

Description
Priam at the feet of Achilles is an oil-on-canvas painting by Jérôme-Martin Langlois completed in 1809. The dimensions of the painting are  x . The subject is from the Iliad and shows Priam, who has entered the Greek camp to offer a ransom for his deceased son Hector's body. Achilles had been dragging the body of Hector behind his chariot as he circled the outer walls of Troy. The painting is a portrayal of the love of a father: in the painting Priam begs Achilles for the body of his son.

Reception
The painting won first prize at the Grand Prix de Rome in 1809.

References

1809 paintings
Paintings by Jérôme-Martin Langlois
Neoclassical paintings
Paintings based on the Iliad